Prince Tega Wanogho (born November 22, 1997) is a Nigerian-born American football offensive tackle for the Kansas City Chiefs of the National Football League (NFL). He played college football at Auburn and was drafted by the Philadelphia Eagles in the sixth round of the 2020 NFL Draft.

Early years
Wanogho was born in Delta State, Nigeria and moved to Alabama in 2014 in hopes of becoming a basketball player. He attended Edgewood Academy in Elmore, Alabama, where he learned to play football as a defensive lineman. Despite playing only one year of football, Wanogho was a 4-star recruit, committing to Auburn University to play college football over offers from Clemson, Georgia, LSU, Ohio State, and Texas, among others.

College career
Wanogho redshirted his first year at Auburn, recovering from a leg injury he suffered while playing basketball his final year of high school. As a converted offensive lineman, he played in 10 games as a backup in 2016. In 2017, he took over as the starter at left tackle and remained there throughout his senior season in 2019, starting a total of 32 games.

Professional career

Philadelphia Eagles
Wanogho was drafted by the Philadelphia Eagles in the sixth round with the 210th overall pick of the 2020 NFL Draft. He was waived from the team on September 5, 2020, and signed to the practice squad the next day. He was elevated to the active roster on January 2, 2021, for the team's week 17 game against the Washington Football Team, and reverted to the practice squad after the game. His practice squad contract with the team expired after the season on January 11, 2021.

Kansas City Chiefs
On January 16, 2021, Wanogho signed with the practice squad of the Kansas City Chiefs. Nine days later, he was released. On January 26, 2021, Wanogho signed a reserves/futures contract with the Chiefs. He was waived on August 31, 2021 and re-signed to the practice squad the next day. He was elevated from the practice squad on October 12, 2021. Wanogho won Super Bowl LVII when the Chiefs defeated the Philadelphia Eagles.

References

External links
Auburn Tigers bio

1997 births
Living people
American sportspeople of Nigerian descent
African-American players of American football
Sportspeople from Delta State
Nigerian players of American football
American football offensive tackles
Auburn Tigers football players
Philadelphia Eagles players
Kansas City Chiefs players
21st-century African-American sportspeople